For each gender 36 athletes qualified for the Games, a maximum of two athletes per gender could qualify from any nation. Qualification methods were the same for both the men's and women's events.

Host nation Great Britain was awarded one qualifying place automatically and two invitational positions were allocated by the UPIM once the rest of the qualifiers were decided.

The first allocation of places to athletes based on competition results occurred between January and August 2011. One place was awarded to the winner of the 2011 World Cup Final.  Nineteen places were determined by continental championships (Europe had 8 spots, Asia 5, the Americas 4, and Africa and Oceania each 1).

Three spots were available at each of the 2011 World Championships and World Championships.

The last seven places were awarded based on the 1 June 2012 world rankings.

Men 
While individual athletes qualify in qualifying events an NOC may only enter up to 2 athletes in each event.  Should more than 2 athletes be eligible the non-selected quota was redistributed.   The places in each event were allocated as follows:

Women 
While individual athletes qualify in qualifying events an NOC may only enter up to 2 athletes in each event.  Should more than 2 athletes be eligible the non-selected quota was redistributed.   The places in each event were allocated as follows:

References

External links
Qualification system

Qualification
Qualification for the 2012 Summer Olympics